The Verizon Tennis Challenge (ex Paine Webber Classic from 1983 in Dallas to 1987 in Orlando) is a defunct Grand Prix tennis circuit and Association of Tennis Professionals (ATP) Tour affiliated men's tennis tournament played from 1983 to 2001. It was held in the United States, in Dallas, Texas in 1983, in Boca Raton, Florida in 1984, in Fort Myers, Florida in 1985 and 1986, in Orlando, Florida from 1987 to 1991, and at the Atlanta Athletic Club in what is now Johns Creek, Georgia from 1992 to 2001. The tournament was played on outdoor hard courts from 1985 to 1991 and on outdoor clay courts from 1992 to 2001.

Past finals

Singles

Doubles

References

 
ATP Tour
Defunct tennis tournaments in the United States
Grand Prix tennis circuit
Hard court tennis tournaments in the United States
Clay court tennis tournaments
Sports in Fort Myers, Florida
1983 establishments in Texas
2001 disestablishments in Georgia (U.S. state)
Recurring sporting events disestablished in 2001
Recurring sporting events established in 1983